Modern Man (subtitled "The Picture Magazine for Men" / "The Man's Picture Magazine" / "The Adult Picture Magazine") is a now defunct monthly men's magazine founded in 1951 and run until 1976. Predating Playboy, Modern Man focused on items of interest to adult men, with an emphasis on soft-core pornography, sex, humor, automobiles and popular culture. It featured photographs of many well-known models and actresses, including Marilyn Monroe, Pat Sheehan, Bambi Hamilton, June Blair, Tara Thomas, Dolores Reed, Jayne Mansfield, and Mamie Van Doren, as well as questionable look-alikes.

See also
List of men's magazines
List of pornographic magazines

References

Pornographic magazines published in the United States
Monthly magazines published in the United States
Defunct magazines published in the United States
Magazines established in 1951
Magazines disestablished in 1967
Softcore pornography